In Greek mythology, Pistis (Ancient Greek: Πίστις) was the personification of good faith, trust and reliability. In Christianity and in the New Testament, pistis is typically translated as "faith".  The word is mentioned together with such other personifications as Elpis (Hope), sophrosyne (Prudence), and the Charites, who were all associated with honesty and harmony among people.

Her Roman equivalent was Fides, a personified concept significant in Roman culture.

Additionally, a close linkage between pastis and persuasion developed through the discussion of faith (belief) and was further morphed by an understanding of pistis as a rhetorical technique.

In rhetoric
Thus, pistis in rhetoric are the elements to induce true judgment through enthymemes, hence to give proof of a statement. There are three modes by which this is employed.  The first mode is the "subject matter capable of inducing a state of mind within the audience." The second pistis is the "subject itself considered under an appeal to the intellect or in its logical aspects." The third pistis is the "logical, rational, and intellectual aspect of the issue under discussion." All three modes of pistis occur in logos as it appeals to logical persuasion.

Greek rhetoric and Christianity
Christian concepts of faith (pistis) were borrowed from Greek rhetorical notions of pistis, perhaps making "argument" a better translation than "faith." Christian pistis deems its persuasion in a positive light as the New Testament concepts of pistis require that a listener be knowledgeable of the subject matter at issue and thus able to fully assent. Whereas, the Greeks took the notion of pistis as persuasive discourse that was elliptical and concentrated on the "affect and effect rather than on the representation of the truth." The evolution of pistis in Christianity as a persuasive rhetorical technique starkly contrasts with its meaning used by the Greeks.

See also
 Faith
 Faith in Christianity

Notes

References 

Greek goddesses
Personifications in Greek mythology